Lorenz is a German name.

Lorenz may also refer to:

Mathematics and science 
 Lorenz system, a system of equations notable for having chaotic solutions
 Lorenz gauge condition, in electromagnetism
 Lorenz curve, an income distribution curve
 Lorenz cipher, a German cryptography machine

Other uses
 St. Lorenz, Nuremberg, Germany
 St. Lorenz Basilica in Kempten im Allgäu, Germany
 C. Lorenz AG, a German electrical and electronics firm
 Lorenz beam, a radio-navigation system
 Lorenz Publishing, American music publisher
 Lorenz rifle, an Austrian rifle designed in 1854
 Lorenz Snack-World, a German food company

See also 
 Lorentz (disambiguation)